Kristine Haglund was editor of Dialogue: A Journal of Mormon Thought in 2009–2015, is a current or former essayist at the weblogs By Common Consent and Times and Seasons, and noted Mormon historian and cultural commentator. She has suggested that the "experience of independent Mormon publishing sector [can provide] ... a potential model" for members "at a moment where new kinds of assimilation are called for."

She has an A.B. from Harvard in German Studies and an M.A. from the University of Michigan in German Literature.

As part of her application for the editor position at Dialogue, Haglund wrote, "Many, many people long for a way to acknowledge the flaws of the church, to think and speak critically about silly aspects of our culture, and assess the inevitable mistakes of human leaders trying to interpret God's will, while still affirming the essential goodness of Mormonism. I've battled through some of the big issues—gender roles, homosexuality, intellectual freedom, historiography—and managed not just to stay in, but to stay happily."

Book
 Eugene England: A Mormon Liberal (Introductions to Mormon Thought series, University of Illinois Press, 2022)

References

External links
"Religion and Elections", C-SPAN, March 13, 2012
 

21st-century American historians
Harvard College alumni
Historians of the Latter Day Saint movement
Historians of Utah
Living people
Mormon bloggers
University of Michigan alumni
American women historians
American Latter Day Saint writers
Editors of Latter Day Saint publications
American bloggers
American women bloggers
Latter Day Saints from Massachusetts
Latter Day Saints from Michigan
Latter Day Saints from Utah
21st-century American non-fiction writers
21st-century American women writers
Year of birth missing (living people)